Wanda is a city in Redwood County, Minnesota, United States. The population was 84 at the 2010 census.

Wanda is in the southwest quadrant of Minnesota.

History
Wanda was platted in 1899. The name is derived from the Ojibwe language, meaning "forgetfulness". A post office has been in operation at Wanda since 1900. Wanda was incorporated in 1901.

Geography

Wanda is west of U.S. Highway 71 and north of U.S. Highway 14. County Highway 17 connects Wanda to County Highway 4, less than one mile to the north, which in turn connects it to U.S. Highway 71, approximately four miles to the east.

Demographics

2010 census
As of the census of 2010, there were 84 people, 39 households, and 25 families living in the city. The racial makeup of the city was 100.0% White.

There were 39 households, of which 20.5% had children under the age of 18 living with them, 51.3% were married couples living together, 5.1% had a female householder with no husband present, 7.7% had a male householder with no wife present, and 35.9% were non-families. 35.9% of all households were made up of individuals, and 12.9% had someone living alone who was 65 years of age or older. The average household size was 2.15 and the average family size was 2.76.

The median age in the city was 50.5 years. 22.6% of residents were under the age of 18; 3.7% were between the ages of 18 and 24; 17.8% were from 25 to 44; 39.3% were from 45 to 64; and 16.7% were 65 years of age or older. The gender makeup of the city was 48.8% male and 51.2% female.

2000 census
At the 2000 census, there were 103 people, 45 households and 27 families living in the city. The racial makeup of the city was 100.00% White.

There were 45 households, of which 24.4% had children under the age of 18 living with them, 48.9% were married couples living together, 11.1% had a female householder with no husband present, and 37.8% were non-families. 37.8% of all households were made up of individuals, and 20.0% had someone living alone who was 65 years of age or older. The average household size was 2.29 and the average family size was 3.04.

Age distribution was 23.3% under the age of 18, 7.8% from 18 to 24, 19.4% from 25 to 44, 26.2% from 45 to 64, and 23.3% who were 65 years of age or older. The median age was 44 years. For every 100 females, there were 114.6 males. For every 100 females age 18 and over, there were 102.6 males.

The median household income was $36,250, and the median family income was $41,250. Males had a median income of $29,444 versus $11,667 for females. The per capita income for the city was $16,213. There were no families and 3.6% of the population living below the poverty line, including no under eighteens and 8.0% of those over 64.

References

Cities in Redwood County, Minnesota
Cities in Minnesota